Vågåmo is the administrative centre of Vågå Municipality in Innlandet county, Norway. The village is located along the Otta River, at the eastern end of the lake Vågåvatn in the Ottadalen valley. The Norwegian National Road 15 passes through the village.

Vågåmo is home to a local museum, the Jutulheimen Bygdemuseum, and to the historical Klones farm which is also the location of the Nord-Gudbrandsdalen Upper Secondary School (videregående skole) which specializes in agriculture. The Klones farm dates back to the 15th century and has been the location of the school since 1919. There are also many horses and a store named Jutulbue there. Vågå Church is located in the village.

References

Vågå
Villages in Innlandet